Margaret Rigsby Becklake,  (May 27, 1922 – October 17, 2018) was a Canadian academic and epidemiologist. Margaret focused her career on the study of environmental and occupational determinants of childhood and adult airway disease, specifically the lung health of asbestos miners and millers.

Born in London, England, Becklake grew up in Pretoria, South Africa, and received an MB and BCh degree in 1944 from the University of the Witwatersrand. She interned at the Johannesburg General Hospital and did postgraduate studies at the British Postgraduate Medical School. In 1950, she became a Junior Lecturer in Medicine at the University of the Witwatersrand where she studied the effects of dust inhalation on workers in the gold mines. In 1957, she emigrated to Montreal, Quebec, where she worked in the Department of Medicine at the Royal Victoria Hospital; she received an academic appointment in the Department of Epidemiology and Health at McGill University, where she retired as an emeritus professor.

In 2007, she was made a Member of the Order of Canada in recognition for having made "outstanding contributions to fighting lung disease through research and education for more than 60 years". In 2011, she was made a Grand Officer of the National Order of Quebec.

She died at home on October 17, 2018.

The Montreal Chest Institute Foundation started the Dr. Margaret Becklake Fellowship to honour her memory. The Fellowship pays a salary to trainees in respiratory research who come from a low- or middle-income country and/or Canadian indigenous community.

References

1922 births
2018 deaths
Canadian medical researchers
Canadian women epidemiologists
Grand Officers of the National Order of Quebec
Members of the Order of Canada
Academic staff of McGill University
People from Pretoria
University of the Witwatersrand alumni
British expatriates in South Africa
British emigrants to Canada